Louis II, known as Louis the Stammerer (1 November 846 – 10 April 879), was the king of Aquitaine and later the king of West Francia. He was the eldest son of Emperor Charles the Bald and Ermentrude of Orléans. Louis the Stammerer was physically weak and outlived his father by a year and a half.

He succeeded his younger brother Charles the Child as the ruler of Aquitaine in 866 and his father in West Francia in 877, but he was never crowned emperor.

Louis was crowned king on 8 October 877 by Hincmar, archbishop of Reims, at Compiegne and was crowned a second time in August 878 by Pope John VIII at Troyes while the pope was attending a council there. The pope may have even offered him the imperial crown, but it was declined. Louis had relatively little impact on politics. He was described "a simple and sweet man, a lover of peace, justice, and religion". In 878, he gave the counties of Barcelona, Girona, and Besalú to Wilfred the Hairy. His final act was to march against the invading Vikings, but he fell ill and died on 9 April or 10 April 879, not long after beginning this final campaign. On his death, his realms were divided between his two sons, Carloman II and Louis III of France.

Family

During the peace negotiations between his father and Erispoe, duke of Brittany, Louis was betrothed to an unnamed daughter of Erispoe in 856. It is not known if this was the same daughter who later married Gurivant. The contract was broken in 857 after Erispoe's murder.

Louis was married twice. His first wife Ansgarde of Burgundy had two sons: Louis (born in 863) and Carloman (born in 866), both of whom became kings of West Francia, and three daughters: Hildegarde (born in 864), Gisela (865–884) and Ermentrude (874–914).

He had a posthumous son, Charles the Simple, by his second wife, Adelaide of Paris, who would become, long after his elder brothers' deaths, king of West Francia.

With his first wife, Ansgarde of Burgundy , he had the following children:
Louis III of France
Carloman II
Princess Ermentrude (874–914).
Princess  Hildegarde (born in 864)
Princess Gisela (865–884)
With his second wife, Adelaide of Paris, he had:
Charles the Simple

References 

 

|-

|-

|-

|-

|-

9th-century kings of West Francia
846 births
879 deaths
Frankish warriors
Counts of Meaux
Dukes of Maine
Carolingian dynasty
Sons of emperors